Borzęcino may refer to the following places:
Borzęcino, Pomeranian Voivodeship (north Poland)
Borzęcino, Gmina Barwice in West Pomeranian Voivodeship (north-west Poland)
Borzęcino, Gmina Biały Bór in West Pomeranian Voivodeship (north-west Poland)